The Herculaneum papyri are more than 1,800 papyri found in the Herculaneum Villa of the Papyri, in the 18th century, carbonized by the eruption of Mount Vesuvius in AD 79.

The papyri, containing a number of Greek philosophical texts, come from the only surviving library from antiquity that exists in its entirety. As many as 44 of the works discovered were written by the Epicurean philosopher and poet Philodemus.

Discovery

Due to the eruption of Mount Vesuvius in 79 AD, bundles of scrolls were carbonized by the intense heat of the pyroclastic flows. This intense parching took place over an extremely short period of time, in a room deprived of oxygen, resulting in the scrolls' carbonization into compact and highly fragile blocks. They were then preserved by the layers of cement-like rock.

In 1752, workmen of the Bourbon royal family accidentally discovered what is now known as the Villa of the Papyri.  There may still be a lower section of the Villa's collection that remains buried.

Ethel Ross Barker noted in her 1908 Buried Herculaneum:

Excavations

In the 18th century, the first digs began. The excavation appeared closer to mining projects, as mineshafts were dug, and horizontal subterranean galleries were installed. Workers would place objects in baskets and send them back up.

With the backing of Charles III of Spain (1716 – 1788), Roque Joaquín de Alcubierre headed the systematic excavation of Herculaneum with Karl Jakob Weber.

Carlo Bonucci. In the year 1868 still further purchases of land were made, and excavations were carried on in an eastward direction till 1875. The total area now open measures 300 by 150 perches (1510 by 756 meters). The limits of the excavations to the north and east respectively are the modern streets of Vico di Mare and Vico Ferrara. It is here only that any portion of ancient Herculaneum may be seen in the open day."

It is uncertain how many papyri were originally found as many of the scrolls were destroyed by workmen or when scholars extracted them from the volcanic tuff.

The official list amounts to 1,814 rolls and fragments, of which 1,756 had been discovered by 1855. In the 90s it was reported that the inventory now comprises 1826 papyri, with more than 340 are almost complete, about 970 are partly decayed and partly decipherable, and more than 500 are merely charred fragments.

In a 2016 open letter, academics asked the Italian authorities to consider new excavations, since it is assumed that many more papyri may be buried at the site. Authors argue that "the volcano may erupt again and put the villa effectively beyond reach" and "Posterity will not forgive us if we squander this chance. The excavation must proceed".

Post-excavation history
In 1802, King Ferdinand IV of Naples offered six rolls to Napoleon Bonaparte in a diplomatic move. In 1803, along with other treasures, the scrolls were transported by Francesco Carelli. Upon receiving the gift, Bonaparte then gave the scrolls to Institut de France under charge of Gaspard Monge and Vivant Denon.

In 1810, eighteen unrolled papyri were given to George IV, four of which he presented to the Bodleian Library; the rest are now mainly in the British Library.

Unrolling

Since their discovery, previous attempts used rose water, liquid mercury, vegetable gas, sulfuric compounds, papyrus juice, or a mixture of ethanol, glycerin, and warm water, in hopes to make scrolls readable. According to Antonio de Simone and Richard Janko at first the papyri were mistaken for carbonized tree branches, some perhaps were even thrown away or burnt to make heat.

Opening a scroll would often damage or destroy the scroll completely. If a scroll had been successfully opened, the original inkexposed to airwould begin to fade. In addition, this form of unrolling often would leave pages stuck together, omitting or destroying additional information.

With X-ray micro-computed tomography (micro-CT), no ink can be seen, as carbon-based ink is not visible on carbonized papyrus.

Early attempts

Following the discovery of the Herculaneum papyri in 1752, per the advice from Bernardo Tanucci, King Charles VII of Naples established a commission to study them.

Possibly the first attempts to read the scrolls were done by the artist Camillo Paderni who was in charge of recovered items. Paderni used the method of slicing scrolls in half, copying readable text, by removing papyri layers. This transcription procedure was used for hundreds of scrolls, and in the process destroyed them.

In 1756, Abbot Piaggio, conserver of ancient manuscripts in the Vatican Library, used a machine he also invented, to unroll the first scroll, which took four years (millimeters per day). The results were then swiftly copied (since the writing rapidly disappeared: see below), reviewed by Hellenist academics, and then corrected once more, if necessary, by the unrolling/copying team.

In 1802, King Ferdinand IV of Naples appointed Rev. John Hayter to assist the process.

From 1802 to 1806, Hayter unrolled and partly deciphered some 200 papyri. These copies are held in the Bodleian Library, where they are known as the "Oxford Facsimiles of the Herculaneum Papyri".

In January 1816, Pierre-Claude Molard and Raoul Rochette led an attempt to unroll one papyrus with a replica of Abbot Piaggio's machine. However, the entire scroll was destroyed without any information being obtained.

From 1819 until 1820, Humphry Davy was commissioned by the prince regent George IV to work on the Herculaneum papyri. Although it is considered that he had only limited success, Davy's chemical method, using chlorine managed to partially unroll 23 manuscripts.

In 1877, a papyrus was taken to a laboratory in the Louvre. An attempt to unravel it was made with a "small mill", but it was unsuccessful and was partially destroyed, leaving only a quarter intact.

By the middle of the 20th century, only 585 rolls or fragments had been completely unrolled, and 209 unrolled in part. Of the unrolled papyri, about 200 had been deciphered and published, and about 150 only deciphered.

Modern attempts

The bulk of the preserved manuscripts are housed in the Office of Herculaneum papyri in National Library of Naples.

In 1969, Marcello Gigante founded the creation of the International Center for the Study of the Herculaneum Papyri (Centro Internazionale per lo Studio dei Papiri Ercolanesi; CISPE). With the intention of working toward the resumption of the excavation of the Villa of the Papyri, and promoting the renewal of studies of the Herculaneum texts, the institution began a new method of unrolling. Using the 'Oslo' method, the CISPE team separated individual layers of the papyri. One of the scrolls exploded into 300 parts, and another did similarly but to a lesser extent.

Since 1999, the papyri have been digitized by applying multi-spectral imaging (MSI) techniques. International experts and prominent scholars participated in the project. On 4 June 2011 it was announced that the task of digitizing 1,600 Herculaneum papyri had been completed.

Since 2007, a team working with Institut de Papyrologie and a group of scientists from Kentucky have been using x-rays and nuclear magnetic resonance to analyze the artifacts.

In 2009, the Institut de France in conjunction with the French National Center for Scientific Research imaged two intact Herculaneum papyri using X-ray micro-computed tomography (micro-CT) to reveal the interior structures of the scrolls. The internal structure of the rolls was revealed to be extremely compact and convoluted, defeating the automatic unwrapping computer algorithms that the team had developed. Manual examination of small segments of the internal structure of the rolls proved more successful, unveiling the individual fibres of the papyrus. Unfortunately, no ink could be seen on the small samples imaged, because carbon-based inks are not visible on the carbonized scrolls. However, some scrolls were written with ink containing lead.

Virtual unrolling
According to Bukreeva et al. 2016, "The procedure of virtual unrolling can be divided into three main steps: volumetric scanning, segmentation, layered texture generation and restoration." Seales et al. 2005 and 2013 developed promising software that integrates functions of flattening and unrolling based on mass-spring surface simulations. Samko et al. 2014 proposed algorithms to solve problems of touching points between adjacent sheet layers.

In 2015, a team led by Dr. Vito Mocella, from the National Research Council's Institute for Microelectronics and Microsystems (CNR-IMM),  has announced that "... X-ray phase-contrast tomography (XPCT) can reveal various letters hidden inside the precious papyri without unrolling them. [...] This pioneering research opens up new prospects not only for the many papyri still unopened, but also for others that have not yet been discovered, perhaps including a second library of Latin papyri at a lower, as yet unexcavated level of the Villa." The microscopic relief of letters – a tenth of a millimeter – on the papyri seems to be enough to create a noticeable phase contrast with the XPCT scans. This team was even able to identify some writing on a still-rolled scroll. With the aim of making these scans cogent, a team is working with the National Science Foundation and Google to develop software which can sort through these displaced letters and figure out where they are located on the scroll.

Following the pioneering results of Dr. Mocella et al., in 2016 another team led by Dr. G. Ranocchia and Dr. A. Cedola announced encouraging results by means of the non-destructive Synchrotron X-ray phase-contrast tomography (XPCT) technique.

In September 2016, a method pioneered by University of Kentucky computer scientist W. Brent Seales was successfully used to unlock the text of a charred parchment from Israel, the En-Gedi Scroll. According to experts, this new method devised by Seales may make it possible to read the carbonized scrolls from Herculaneum.

The virtual unwrapping process begins with using a volumetric scan to scan the damaged scroll. These scans are non-invasive, and generate a 3D mapping which differentiates between the ink and the paper. The virtual unwrapping process is independent of which type of volumetric scan is used, which allows scientists to test out different scanning methods to find which distinguishes ink from paper best and which easily accommodates scanning upgrades. The only data needed for the virtual unwrapping process is this volumetric scan, so after this point the scroll was safely returned to its protective archive. In the case of the Herculaneum papyri, the volumetric scan used X-ray phase-contrast tomography, which proved most beneficial for the study of ancient papyri in a feasibility test conducted in 2015.  This method of volumetric scanning is most beneficial for the Herculaneum papyri because these papyri have carbon-based ink, which will have the same material characteristics as the carbon-based papyrus. This makes it difficult to image using many of the traditional imaging techniques, which often use differences in the light absorption/emission characteristics of different materials to create these volumetric scans. XPCT, on the other hand, examines the phase of x-ray radiation after it emerges from the scroll to determine its composition. Because the ink is raised relative to the papyrus, the radiation will be traveling in the material of the scroll slightly longer when it passes through a spot with ink than when it passes through a spot with a blank space. This means that when the radiation emerges from the paper, its phase will be slightly different than that of the empty space, allowing researchers to distinguish ink-covered spots from blank spots.  While this technique does allow researchers to visualize places with ink, it is much less clear than techniques such as  CT scans which distinguish between different materials because slight changes (thinner ink, thicker papyrus, folds in the papyrus) all contribute to noise in the volumetric scan.
 
The volumetric scan allows the computer to associate the composition of the scroll with corresponding positions, called voxels or volume-pixels. The goal of the virtual unwrapping process is to determine the layered structure of the scroll and try to peel back each layer while keeping track of which voxel is being peeled and what composition it corresponds to. By transforming the voxels from a 3D volumetric scan to a 2D image, the writing on this inside is revealed to the viewer. This process happens in three steps: segmentation, texturing and flattening.

Segmentation
The first stage of the virtual unwrapping process, segmentation, involves identifying geometric models for the structures within the virtual scan of the scroll. Because of the extensive damage, the parchment has become deformed and no longer has a clearly cylindrical geometry. Instead, some portions may look planar, some conical, some triangular, etc. Therefore, the most efficient way to assign a geometry to the layer is to do so in a piecewise fashion. Rather than modeling the complex geometry of the entire layer of the scroll, the piecewise model breaks each layer into more regular shapes that are easy to work with. This makes it easy to virtually lift off each piece of the layer one at a time. Because each voxel is ordered, peeling off each layer will preserve the continuity of the scroll structure.

Texturing
The second stage, texturing, focuses on identifying intensity values that correspond with each voxel using texture mapping. From the volumetric scan, each voxel has a corresponding composition. After virtually peeling off the layers during the segmentation process, the texturing step matches the voxels of each geometric piece to their corresponding compositions so that an observer is able to see the text written on each piece. In ideal cases, the scanned volume will match perfectly with the surface of each geometric piece and yield perfectly rendered text, but there are often small errors in the segmentation process that generate noise in the texturing process. Because of this, the texturing process usually includes nearest-neighbor interpolation texture filtering to reduce the noise and sharpen the lettering.

Flattening
After segmentation and texturing, each piece of the virtually deconstructed scroll is ordered and has its corresponding text visualized on its surface. This is, in practice, enough to ‘read’ the inside of the scroll, but for the arts and antiquities world, it is often best to convert this to a 2D flat image to demonstrate what the scroll’s parchment would have looked like if they could physically unravel without damage. This requires the virtual unwrapping process to include a step that converts the curved 3D geometric pieces into flat 2D planes. To do so, the virtual unwrapping models the points on the surface of each 3D piece as masses connected by springs where the springs will come to rest only when the 3D pieces are perfectly flat. This technique is inspired by the mass-spring systems traditionally used to model deformation.

After segmenting, textualizing, and flattening the scroll to obtain 2D text fragments, the last step is a merge step meant to reconcile each individual segment to visualize the unwrapped parchment as a whole. This involves two parts: texture merging and mesh merging.

Texture Merging
Texture merging aligns the textures from each segment to create a composite. This process is fast and gives feedback on the quality of the segmentation and alignment of each piece. While this is good enough to create a basic image of what the scroll looks like, there are some distortions which arise because each segment is individually flattened. Therefore, this is the first step in the merging process, used to check if the segmentation, texturing, and flattening processes were done correctly, but does not produce a final result.

Mesh Merging
Mesh merging is more precise and is the final step in visualizing the unwrapped scroll. This type of merging recombines each point on the surface of each segment with the corresponding point on its neighbor segment to remove the distortions due to individual flattening. This step also re-flattens and re-textures the image to create the final visualization of the unwrapped scroll, and is computationally expensive compared to the texture merging process detailed above.

Using each of these steps, the computer is able to transform the voxels from the 3D volumetric scan and their corresponding density brightnesses to a 2D virtually unwrapped image of the text inside. These techniques, while successful at isolating the layers of the papyri, had difficulty detecting text clearly due to the complex geometry of the sheets, such as the criss-cross structure of the papyrus fibres and the sheets, pleats, holes, tears, and contamination from the extensive damage. One potential source of error might be the 3D volumetric scan itself or the flattening procedure used to read it since the algorithms are not able to perfectly prevent distortions in the reading of these papyri.  

Seales presented in 2018 readability of parts of a Herculaneum papyri (P.Herc. 118) from the Bodleian Libraries, at Oxford University, which was given by the King Ferdinand of Naples to the Prince of Wales in 1810. The imaging method Seales used involved a hand-held 3-D scanner called an Artec Space Spider. The same year he demonstrated readability success of another Herculaneum scroll, with help of the particle accelerator Diamond Light Source, through a powerful x-rays imaging technique, letter ink which contains trace amounts of lead were detected. This technique could possibly open the door in reading the remaining unopened 500 Herculaneum scrolls. Prior to this he demonstrated successful virtual unrolling without detecting ink on Herculaneum scrolls.

Vesuvius Challenge 
In 2023, Nat Friedman, Daniel Gross, and Dr. Brent Seales launched Vesuvius Challenge, aimed "to decipher Herculaneum scrolls using 3D X-ray software" with a prize of 250,000 $.

Significance

Until the middle of the 18th century, the only papyri known were a few survivals from medieval times. Most likely, these rolls would never have survived the Mediterranean climate and would have crumbled or been lost. Indeed, all these rolls have come from the only surviving library from antiquity that exists in its entirety.

These papyri contain a large number of Greek philosophical texts. Large parts of Books XIV, XV, XXV, and XXVIII of the magnum opus of Epicurus, On Nature and works by early followers of Epicurus are also represented among the papyri. Of the rolls, 44 have been identified as the work of Philodemus of Gadara, an Epicurean philosopher and poet. The manuscript "PHerc.Paris.2" contains part of Philodemus' On Vices and Virtues.

The Stoic philosopher Chrysippus is attested to have written over 700 works, all of them lost, with the exception of a few fragments quoted by other authors. Segments of his works On Providence and Logical Questions were found among the papyri; a third work of his may have been recovered from the charred rolls.

Parts of a poem on the Battle of Actium have also survived in the library.

In May 2018, it was reported that fragments of the lost work Histories by Seneca the Elder have been found on a papyrus scroll (PHerc. 1067).

Additional images

See also

Conservation issues of Pompeii and Herculaneum
Friends of Herculaneum Society
Ancient Greek literature
Villa of the Papyri
Eruption of Mount Vesuvius in 79
Ercolano
En-Gedi Scroll

References

Further reading
 Armstrong, David. 2011. "Epicurean Virtues, Epicurean Friendship: Cicero vs. The Herculaneum Papyri." In Epicurus and the Epicurean Tradition. Edited by Jeffrey Fish and Kirk R. Sanders. Cambridge; New York: Cambridge University Press
 
 
 Houston, George W. 2013. "The Non-Philodemus Book Collection in the Villa of the Papyri." In Ancient Libraries Edited by  Jason König, Katerina Oikonomopoulou, Greg Woolf, 183-208. Cambridge; New York : Cambridge University Press.
 Janko, Richard. 1993. Philodemus Resartus: Progress in Reconstructing the Philosophical Papyri from Herculaneum. In Proceedings of the Boston Area Colloquium in Ancient Philosophy: VII, 1991. Edited by John J. Cleary. Lanham, Md. & London: University Press of America. 
 
 
 Seales, W. Brent, Jim Griffioen, and David Jacobs. 2011. "Virtual Conservation: Experience with Micro-CT and Manuscripts." In Eikonopoiia: Digital Imaging of Ancient Textual Heritage: Proceedings of the International Conference, Helsinki, 28–29 November 2010. Edited by Vesa Vahtikari, Mika Hakkarainen, and Antti Nurminen, 81–88. Helsinki: Societas Scientiarum Fennica.
 Sider, David. 2005. The Library of the Villa dei Papiri at Herculaneum. Los Angeles: J. Paul Getty Museum
 Zarmakoupi, Mantha, ed. 2010. The Villa of the Papyri at Herculaneum: Archaeology, Reception, and Digital Reconstruction. Berlin: de Gruyter.
 Vassallo, Christian. 2021. The Presocratics at Herculaneum: A Study of Early Greek Philosophy in the Epicurean Tradition. Berlin - Boston: de Gruyter.
 Turenko, Vitalii. 2022. New edition of Рresocratic fragments: materials of Herculaneum papyrin. Sententiae, 41(2), 166–176.

External links
 Bodleian Library MS. Gr. class. b. 1 (P)/1-12 
 Rawson, C., ed. Out of the Ashes: Recovering the Lost Library of Herculaneum. DVD. 2003. Provo, UT: Brigham Young University. 
 BYU Herculaneum Project Honored with Mommsen Prize
 Wüerzburg Center for Epicurean Studies
 Porter, James I., Hearing Voices: The Herculaneum Papyri and Classical Scholarship
 UCLA Department of Classics: The Philodemus Project
 The Friends of Herculaneum Society
 An incomplete list of papyri from Herculaneum with high resolution photographs.
 A Guide to Editions and Translations of the Principal Works Discovered at Herculaneum and Related Texts

Papyrology
1st-century manuscripts
Herculaneum (ancient city)
Archaeological discoveries in Italy
Papyrus collections